Louis Mosiello was a Republican member of the New York State Assembly representing Yonkers. He was elected in 2004. He was previously elected five times to the Westchester County Board of Legislators.

References

|-

Politicians from Westchester County, New York
Living people
Republican Party members of the New York State Assembly
Legislators from Westchester County, New York
Year of birth missing (living people)